The Sumatran partridge, or Sumatran hill partridge, (Arborophila sumatrana) is a bird species in the family Phasianidae. It is found in highland forest in central Sumatra, Indonesia. It is sometimes treated as a subspecies of the grey-breasted partridge (A. orientalis).

References

Sumatran partridge
Birds of Sumatra
Sumatran partridge
Taxonomy articles created by Polbot